The Northern California megaregion (also Northern California Megalopolis), distinct from Northern California, is an urbanized region of California consisting of many large cities including San Jose, San Francisco, Sacramento, and Oakland.  There are varying definitions of the megaregion, but it is generally seen as encompassing the San Francisco Bay Area, the Sacramento area, northern San Joaquin Valley, and the Monterey Bay Area.

The most common definition of the megaregion consists of the San Jose–San Francisco–Oakland Combined Statistical Area, the Sacramento-Roseville-Arden-Arcade Metropolitan Statistical Area, the Yuba City Metropolitan Statistical Area, the Modesto-Merced Combined Statistical Area, and the Salinas Metropolitan Area.  Under this definition, the megaregion was home to 12.6 million residents in 2018, and had a GDP of $1.21 trillion, resulting in a GDP per capita of $96,029.  The megaregion thus accounted for 3.9% of the U.S. population, and 5.9% of the U.S. economy in 2018.

The concept is seen as increasingly relevant in the context of a rapidly growing Northern California economy plagued by transportation issues and a lack of affordable housing.

The region is home to some of the world's highest ranked universities, including Stanford University, University of California - Berkeley, University of California - San Francisco, and University of California - Davis.

Concept 
In 2005, the Regional Plan Association launched its program, America 2050, which outlined 11 megaregions of the United States, including a "Northern California Megaregion."  This proposed region extended from Monterey to Sonoma County and from Fresno to Reno, Nevada.  In 2007, the San Francisco Bay Area Planning and Urban Research Association (SPUR), published a report detailing a more restrictive definition of the Megaregion, which included the counties and metropolitan areas highlighted in the map below. In 2016, the Bay Area Council's Economic Institute published a report titled, "The Northern California Megaregion," using the same delineation for the region as the SPUR report.  The report listed the megaregion as being the fifth most populous U.S. megaregion, as having the highest Gross Regional Product per capita of any U.S. megaregion, and as making up over 5% of the U.S. economy.  The report also stated that as of 2013, 188 thousand commuters crossed between the subregions of the megaregion daily, including 132 thousand moving from the outer subregions into the Bay Area daily.

The Capitol Corridor Joint Powers Authority has integrated the concept into their "Vision Plan" to increase connectedness between the Bay Area and Sacramento Area.

The Metropolitan Transportation Commission (MTC) has used the concept in several programs and analyses, including their "Northern California Mega-Region Goods Movement Study," a partnership between the MTC, the Sacramento Area Council of Governments, the Association of Monterey Bay Area Governments, the San Joaquin Council of Governments, and Caltrans.

Infrastructure and transportation 

The megaregion's transportation network consists of a number of highways, passenger rail lines, bus services, and ferry lines.

The region's passenger rail service includes:

 Altamont Corridor Express, connecting San Jose, the Tri-Valley, and San Joaquin County
 Amtrak's Capitol Corridor and San Joaquins lines, connecting the Bay Area with Sacramento and the San Joaquin Valley, in addition to the California Zephyr and Coast Starlight long distance inter-city rail services
 Bay Area Rapid Transit (BART), which will soon connect the Bay Area's five most populous counties
 Caltrain, connecting San Francisco to the Peninsula and Silicon Valley
 Sacramento Regional Transit, light rail and bus transit service in Sacramento and surrounding areas
 Muni Metro, light rail in San Francisco
 SMART, connecting Sonoma and Marin counties
 VTA light rail, light rail in Santa Clara County

California High-Speed Rail, projected to be completed sometime beyond 2033, will tie the region closer together, and also connect it with the Southern California Megaregion.

Metropolitan areas

Subregions

See also 

Northern California
San Francisco Bay Area
Megaregions of the United States
Megalopolis
California

References

External links
 America 2050

Megapolitan areas of California
Northern California